Richard C. Thurlow is an historian of Fascism in Britain. He is a graduate of the University of York and the University of Sussex and now an honorary lecturer at the University of Sheffield where he formerly taught.

Selected publications

Articles
"Powers of Darkness: Conspiracy, Belief and Political Strategy." Patterns of Prejudice, Vol. 12, No. 6, 1978, pp. 1–12, 23. .
"Jew Wise: Dimensions of British Political Anti-semitism, 1918-1939." Immigrants and Minorities, Vol. 6, No. 1, 1987, pp. 44–65.
"British Fascism and State Surveillance, 1934-45." Intelligence and National Security, Vol. 1, 1988, pp. 77–99.
"'A Very Clever Capitalist Class': British Communism and State Surveillance, 1939-1945." Intelligence and National Security, Vol. 12, No. 2, April 1997.
"The Guardian of the 'Sacred Flame': The Failed Political Resurrection of Sir Oswald Mosley after 1945." Journal of Contemporary History, Vol. 33, No. 2, April 1998, pp. 241–254. .
"The Evolution of the Mythical British Fifth Column, 1939-46." Twentieth Century British History, Vol. 10, No. 4, 1999, pp. 477–498.
"Charm Offensive: The Coming out of MI5." Intelligence and National Security, Vol. 15, No. 1, 2000, pp. 183–190.

Books
 British Fascism: Essays on the Radical Right in Inter-War Britain. Croom Helm, 1980. (Editor with Kenneth Lunn)
 Fascism in Britain: A History, 1918-85. Basil Blackwell, Oxford, 1987. 
 The Secret State: British Internal Security in the Twentieth Century. Oxford University Press, Oxford, 1994.
 Fascism. Cambridge Perspectives in History. Cambridge University Press, Cambridge, 1999.
 Fascism in Modern Britain. Sutton, Stroud, 2000

Chapters
"Blaming the Blackshirts: The Authorities and the Anti-Jewish Disturbances in the 1930s." In: P. Panayi (ed.) Racial Violence in Britain. Leicester University Press, 1993, pp. 112–129.

References 

Living people
Year of birth missing (living people)
Academics of the University of Sheffield
Historians of fascism
Fascism in the United Kingdom
Alumni of the University of York
Alumni of the University of Sussex